

Empress consort of Mexico

House of Iturbide, 1822–1823

House of Habsburg-Lorraine, 1864–1867

Titular Imperial consort of Mexico

House of Iturbide, 1823–1866

House of Habsburg-Lorraine-Iturbide, since 1867

See also

 First Lady of Mexico

External links
The Genealogy of the House of Iturbide
The Peerage

Mexican monarchy

Mexico
Mexican nobility